All Saints Church, Leighton Buzzard, is the fine Early English parish church for the town of Leighton Buzzard in the English county of Bedfordshire.

History

The church is dedicated to All Saints and has a 190 foot spire and some outstanding medieval ironwork, graffiti and roofs, "aflutter" with carved angels gifted in the mid 15th century by Alice de la Pole, Countess of Suffolk and grand daughter of Geoffrey Chaucer. It has been described as the cathedral of South Bedfordshire (Bishop of St Albans at the re-hallowing ceremony on 7 May 1989) and is probably the finest church in the county (John Betjeman in Collins Guide to Parish Churches). Dating from 1277 it is the second church on the site. Such an old structure requires constant attention through its Preservation Trust.

The Church was severely damaged by fire in 1985. The fire happened just as a restoration programme was nearing completion. It destroyed the chancel roof and severely damaged the nave roof and caused serious structural damage to the tower, spire, and the vestry areas and a number of the windows were damaged beyond repair. The ring of ten bells was lost as were both the organs. The total cost of the damage exceeded £1.5 million (US$2.4 million). Within 24 hours of the blaze the congregation had begun its second restoration programme in as many years. The 15th century roofs, described as the church's tour de force, have been repaired and the fine carvings of angels and saints which adorn them have been repaired or replaced. The spire has been stitched and relined with fresh stone. The tower has been stabilised with a massive internal ring beam.

Serious structural faults were discovered in the tower which supports the spire in 1998 and after a thorough survey of the whole building the following year more problems were  uncovered; a seven phase programme of repair was then drawn up by architect Michael Dales. In the sixteen years which followed, the tower was secured with 262 steel anchors and voids in the walls filled. Eroded stone replaced and cement pointing changed to lime mortar. Other hitherto unknown defects were uncovered and dealt with right around the church, the result of use of cement, the weather, extreme old age and long term effects of the fire. Twenty three Kempe windows in the nave were removed and repaired and other windows were dealt with in situ. One roof was recovered others repaired. A new external corbel figure was added to the east wall of St Hugh chapel to mark completion of this work, it is of Terry Warburton who fundraised and steered the sixteen-year project.

Completion of this project was marked in May 2016 with a special service of thanksgiving. Total cost of this project was nearly £2m.

Parsons / Prebendaries 
William Gynewell: fl. 1381

Misericords

All Saints' has 25, late 14th century misericords, the weathering on the stalls probably indicates that they were in a builder's yard for some time - which is not as unusual as it may seem - their origin is unknown, some think they may have originated at St Albans Abbey, which was pretty much gutted at the time of the Dissolution of the Monasteries, although this cannot be proved, other suggestions range from Fountains Abbey (there is an historical connection) and more locally Chicksands Priory.  It is also worth noting that the fan shaped slots at the free ends of the stalls are indicative that they have been shortened at some point.

Organ

The organ was rebuilt following the fire of 1985 by Harrison and Harrison of Durham. A specification and photographs of the organ can be found on the National Pipe Organ Register. Following restoration work of the previous sixteen years on the building a thorough organ overhaul was undertaken in 2018

External links
All Saints Church website
All Saints Church Preservation trust website

References

All Saints, Leighton Buzzard
Leighton Buzzard